Gokarakonda Naga "G. N." Saibaba is an Indian scholar, writer, human rights activist, and professor. 

He was accused by the government of links with banned left wing extremist organizations and was convicted to life imprisonment by a session court in 2017. He was acquitted of the charges under Unlawful Activities (Prevention) Act by Nagpur bench of the Bombay High Court on 14 October 2022. The Supreme Court of India suspended the order of acquital.

Personal life 
Saibaba was born  in Amalapuram, a town in East Godavari of the Indian state of Andhra Pradesh, in a poor peasant family. He has used a wheelchair since the age of five due to polio. He has had several health problems while imprisoned and is 80% physically handicapped.

Education 
Having studied at Sree Konaseema Bhanoji Ramars (SKBR) College in Amalapuram, he finished his degree at the top of the university. He obtained his M.A. in English from University of Hyderabad. In 2013, he completed his PhD dissertation which was awarded by Delhi University. His doctoral thesis was on "Indian Writing in English and Nation Making: Reading the Discipline".

Literary contribution 
Saibaba's literary inspiration are Gurajada Apparao, Sri Sri, and the Kenyan Ngugi Wa Thiong'o. 
Saibaba's early works in Telugu were published in Srijana, an Indian magazine. These early articles focused on the dominant forms of knowledge that worked against dalit and adivasi assertions in the Indian Novel.

Career 
Saibaba taught English at Ram Lal Anand College of Delhi University for several years. He received life imprisonment for his connections to Maoists and was removed from Assistant professor post at Ram Lal Anand College of Delhi University in February 2021.

Political activity and arrest 

During the Mumbai Resistance 2004, a platform of over 310 political movements organised parallel to the World Social Forum, Saibaba participated as an active organiser. During this period he became a part of the International League of People’s Struggle (ILPS).

In 2005, he joined the Revolutionary Democratic Front (RDF) which was banned in August 2012 by the AP government under Andhra Pradesh Public Security Act 1992 for alleged subversive activities.

In 2009, he was a prominent voice in the campaign against Operation Green Hunt, mainly the military actions perpetrated by the Indian state.

He was arrested in May 2014 for Maoist links. He was granted bail by Bombay High Court in June 2015 on medical grounds and he was released in July 2015. He was sent back to jail in December 2015 was released again in April 2016 after Supreme Court granted him bail.

He was sentenced to life imprisonment in March 2017 under Sections 13, 18, 20, 38 and 39 of the UAPA and Section 120 B of the Indian Penal Code for connections with the banned Revolutionary Democratic Front (RDF), an organisation linked with the banned Communist Party of India (Maoist). Saibaba denied the charge that organisation he ran was a front for CPI-Maoist.

The Maoist called for "Bharat Bandh" on 29 March 2017 to protest against Saibaba's life imprisonment with banners and pamphlets distributed by the CPI-Maoist at Maharashtra and Chhattisgarh region.

On 30 April 2020, a panel of experts with the United Nations OHCHR called on the Indian government urging the authorities to immediately release G.N. Saibaba, due to his “seriously deteriorating” health condition.

On 28 July 2020, the Bombay High Court rejected Saibaba's 45-day medical bail petition. He was denied permission to visit his 74-year-old mother who died of cancer, and after she died was denied to participate in funeral rituals.

On 22 October 2020, Saibaba called off his hunger strike after his demands about cctv cameras were accepted by the jail authorities.

In April 2021, he was terminated from Ram Lal Anand College of Delhi University. His professorship stands terminated as of July 2021.

In October 2022, Saibaba and five others were acquitted by a high court bench that set aside the life imprisonment sentence awarded to them in 2017. The bench concluded that the proceedings before the sessions court were "null and void" in the absence of a valid sanction under Unlawful Activities (Prevention) Act (UAPA). However, days after that the Supreme Court of India suspended his acquittal. The Court found fault with the High Court's order and observed the High Court has not considered the incriminating material against him as well as the merits of the case.

References 

Living people
1967 births
Indian writers
Indian human rights activists
Andhra Pradesh academics
People with polio
Hunger strikers
Indian prisoners sentenced to life imprisonment
Delhi University